John George French (born August 25, 1950) is a Canadian former professional ice hockey player who played 420 games in the World Hockey Association.

Born in Orillia, Ontario, he played with the New England Whalers, San Diego Mariners, and Indianapolis Racers.

Career statistics

External links 

1950 births
Baltimore Clippers players
Canadian ice hockey centres
Ice hockey people from Ontario
Indianapolis Racers players
Living people
Montreal Canadiens draft picks
Montreal Voyageurs players
New England Whalers players
San Diego Mariners players
Toronto Marlboros players

References